The 2014 Gracia–Orlová was the 28th edition of a stage race held in the Czech Republic, with a UCI rating of 2.2. It was the seventh stage race of the 2014 Women's Elite cycling calendar.

The 2014 edition of the race faced some organisational problems; there were two less stages compared to the 2013 edition of the race. The organisers had to cancel a stage only a month before the race, due to two sponsors dropping out.

The winner of the 2013 edition, Ellen van Dijk, did not start, as she competed in the concurrent Festival Luxembourgeois du cyclisme féminin Elsy Jacobs. Furthermore, who won most of the stages in 2013, did not compete in the 2014 edition.

Stages

Prologue
1 May 2014 – Havířov, individual time trial (ITT)

Prologue Result and General Classification after Prologue

Stage 1
2 May 2014 – Dětmarovice to Štramberk,

Stage 2
3 May 2014 – Lichnov to Lichnov,

Stage 3
4 May 2014 – Orlová to Orlová,

Classification leadership

References

2014 in women's road cycling
2014
2014 in Czech sport